The Ambassador Hotel Hsinchu is skyscraper hotel completed in 2001 in East District, Hsinchu, Taiwan. When the building was completed in 2001, it was the tallest building in Hsinchu. It held the title for 15 years before being surpassed by CIWC Tower in 2016.

The Hotel
The location of the hotel is situated in the Hsinchu city center, with close proximity to Hsinchu Science Park, Hsinchu railway station and Hsinchu HSR station. The hotel has a total of 257 rooms including 16 premium suites, themed restaurants, one café and a bar. The hotel also features a 20-meter temperature-controlled swimming pool with city views as well as a gym with cardio and weight equipment, sauna, and a steam room.

Restaurants & Bars 
 A Cut Steakhouse: Restaurant offering steaks as well as wine.
 The Chinese Restaurant: Chinese restaurant featuring traditional  Cantonese cuisine as well as Dim Sum and Peking duck.
 Promenade: Buffet offering a wide variety of dishes from around the globe, including Chinese, Japanese, and Western cuisine.
 A Shabu: Shabu-shabu restaurant located on the 12th floor.
 Corner Bakery 63: Offers freshly baked pastries and cakes

See also
 Mandarin Oriental, Taipei
 Ambassador Hotel Kaohsiung
 Sheraton Hsinchu Hotel

References

External links
Ambassador Hotel Hsinchu Official Website 
Ambassador Hotel Hsinchu - Tourism Bureau of the Ministry of Transport of the Republic of China 

2001 establishments in Taiwan
Buildings and structures in Hsinchu
Skyscraper hotels in Taiwan
Hotels in Hsinchu
Hotel buildings completed in 2001
Skyscrapers in Hsinchu